Social Capital Films, a subsidiary of Social Capital Entertainment, is a global media company with a diverse portfolio of projects spanning film, music and interactive entertainment.  It was founded in 2004 by producer and real estate investor Martin Shore.

Films
Social Capital Films recently produced and financed the psychological thriller, Tell-Tale, together with Ridley and Tony Scott. Tell Tale starred Josh Lucas, Lena Headey and Brian Cox, and was directed by Michael Cuesta (L.I.E., Dexter). They are soon to release 2001 Maniacs: Field of Screams, the highly anticipated sequel to 2001 Maniacs, the 2005 Lionsgate horror success that left genre fans demanding more.

Other previous films include the period drama The Countess (Julie Delpy's follow-up to 2 Days in Paris) and Hood of Horror (Lionsgate).

Soundtracks
The company has also produced soundtracks for such films as Saw (Lionsgate), Saw II (Lionsgate), Rize (Lionsgate) and Rock School (Newmarket), as well as for television series including Summerland.

External links
 Official Website
 Social Capital on the Internet Movie Database
 Martin Shore on the Internet Movie Database
 Screen Daily: "Social Partners", October 17, 2008

Film production companies of the United States
Entertainment companies based in California
Companies based in Santa Monica, California
Entertainment companies established in 2004
2004 establishments in California